Callidium is a genus of beetles in the family Cerambycidae, containing the following species:

 Callidium angustipennis Chemsak, 1964
 Callidium antennatum Newman, 1838
 Callidium bifasciatum Fabricius, 1787
 Callidium biguttatum Sallé, 1856
 Callidium brevicorne Olivier, 1790
 Callidium californicum Casey, 1912
 Callidium cicatricosum Mannerheim, 1853
 Callidium duodecimsignatum Perroud, 1855
 Callidium frigidum Casey, 1912
 Callidium fulvicolle Fabricius, 1792
 Callidium hoppingi Linsley, 1957
 Callidium juniperi Fisher, 1920
 Callidium leechi Linsley & Chemsak, 1963
 Callidium powelli Linsley & Chemsak, 1963
 Callidium pseudotsugae Fisher, 1920
 Callidium rufipenne Motschulsky, 1860
 Callidium schotti Schaeffer, 1917
 Callidium sempervirens Linsley, 1942
 Callidium sequoiarium Fisher, 1920
 Callidium texanum Schaeffer, 1917
 Callidium vandykei Linsley, 1957
 Callidium violaceipenne Linsley & Chemsak, 1963
 Callidium violaceum (Linnaeus, 1758)
 Callidium viridocyaneum Linsley & Chemsak, 1963

Fossil record
This genus is known in the fossil record from the Eocene to the Pliocene (from about 37.2 to Recent). Fossils of species within this genus have been found in Poland, Germany and France.

References

 
Taxa named by Johan Christian Fabricius
Cerambycidae genera